Adelphothrips is a genus of thrips in the family Phlaeothripidae. Species are known to occur on Java, Fiji and in the Philippines.

Species
 Adelphothrips ignotus
 Adelphothrips longisetosus
 Adelphothrips novioris
 Adelphothrips tristis
 Adelphothrips vernoniae

References

Phlaeothripidae
Thrips genera